Shylan Saliendrakumar (Malayalam: ശൈലന്‍; born 29 March 1975), known by his pen name Shylan, is a Malayalam language poet, film critic, travelogue writer and columnist from Malappuram, Kerala, India. Mostly known for his poems, several poetry collections by Shylan have been published so far. Shylan is also known as a film critic, who has been revieweing movies for numerous online publications.

Life and career
Shylan was born on 29 March 1975 in Malappuram, Kerala. He completed his college from NSS College, Manjeri. Shylan started writing in the leading periodicals in Malayalam in the early 2000's. His first book titled Nishkasithante Easter was published in 2003. Shylan was noticed for bringing new styles and vocabularies in Malayalam poems. Vettaikkaran, which is a collection of poems written by Shylan in 2017 was critically acclaimed. In 2022, 'Rashtramee Mamsa', another collection of poems by Shylan was published. This was critically acclaimed for highlighting the contemporary issues in India. The same year, Shylan's first travelogue titled as Nooru Nooru Yatragal was published at the Sharjah International book festival.

Bibiliography

Nishkasithante easter -2003
Ottakapakshi -2003
Thamraparni -2006
Love eXXXperiences of a scoundrel poet -2010
Dejaa Vu -2012
Vettaikaaran -2017
Shylante Kavithakal -2017
Art of Loving -2018
(In) decent life of Mahashylan -2018
Rashtramee_maamsa -2022
Nooru Nooru Yathrakal -2022

References

Malayali people
Malayalam novelists
Malayalam poets
Malayalam-language writers
Malayalam short story writers
1975 births
Living people
21st-century Indian short story writers
Indian male short story writers
Indian male poets
21st-century Indian novelists
People from Malappuram district
Novelists from Kerala
Indian male novelists
21st-century Indian male writers
Indian film critics